Patrick James O'Flynn (born 29 August 1965) is an English journalist and Social Democratic Party (SDP) politician who served as Member of the European Parliament (MEP) for the East of England from 2014 to 2019. He was elected for the UK Independence Party (UKIP) but defected to the SDP in November 2018. Since 2019 he has written frequently for The Spectator.

Early life and journalism
O'Flynn read economics at King's College, Cambridge, graduating in 1987. He subsequently received a diploma in journalism from City, University of London. He then worked as chief political commentator and then political editor at the Daily Express.

Political career
O'Flynn was the UK Independence Party spokesperson on the economy until 19 May 2015.

He was the UKIP candidate in Cambridge at the general election in 2015 and came fifth, with 5.2 per cent of the vote. Afterwards he described UKIP leader Nigel Farage as "snarling, thin-skinned and aggressive".

O'Flynn was the running-mate for Lisa Duffy in the September 2016 UK Independence Party leadership election. He left the UKIP frontbench in July 2017, believing that the party no longer supported his centrist economic policies. He joined the SDP in November 2018. He cited UKIP leader Gerard Batten's appointment of Tommy Robinson (Stephen Yaxley-Lennon) as an adviser as a key reason for his departure from the party. He said of his decision to join the SDP: "like many on the communitarian wing of [UKIP], I have decided to join the resurgent SDP, which campaigned for Brexit during the referendum and espouses broad and moderate pro-nation state political values that I – and I believe many of our voters from 2014 – will be delighted to endorse." In defecting, O'Flynn became the first MEP to sit in the European Parliament for the SDP (though in 1984 Michael Gallagher MEP had joined the original SDP).

O'Flynn stood as the SDP candidate in the 2019 Peterborough by-election, but received only 135 votes (0.4 per cent), and lost to Lisa Forbes. O'Flynn narrowly avoided a repeat of the   1990 Bootle by-election result by beating the Monster Raving Loony Party candidate, who polled 112.

In April 2021 O'Flynn started the Snap, a podcast with Michael Heaver.

References

1965 births
Alumni of City, University of London
Alumni of King's College, Cambridge
Daily Express people
English people of Irish descent
Living people
MEPs for England 2014–2019
People from Cambridge
Social Democratic Party (UK, 1990–present) MEPs
UK Independence Party MEPs
UK Independence Party parliamentary candidates
British Eurosceptics
British political candidates